Flamencopsis is a genus of mygalomorph spiders, with only one species, Flamencopsis minima, found in  Chile. The specific name was given because it is the smallest member of the tribe Diplothelopsini.

Description
Female: total length ; cephalothorax length , width ; cephalic region length , width ; fovea width ; medial ocular quadrangle (OQ) length , width ; labium length , width ; sternum length , width . Its cephalic region is wide, short and strongly convex, with its fovea procurved. Its labium possesses no cuspules. A serrula is not visible. Chelicerae: rastellum is formed by short blunt cusps, and it has a fang furrow with 8 large denticles. Its cephalothorax, legs and palpi are a grayish-brownish yellow colour, while its abdomen has a dorsal blackish-brownish chevron.
Male: total length ; cephalothorax length , width ; cephalic region length , width ; OQ length , width ; labium length , width ; sternum length , width . Its labium possesses no cuspules, its maxillae having 8 thick but attenuate cuspules. A serrula is absent. Its sternal sigilla is small and shallow, and its sternum is rebordered. Chelicerae: rastellum has thick attenuate setae and a fang furrow with large denticles. Cheliceral tumescence is large and rounded. Color as in female.

Distribution and behaviour
Only known from the provinces of Chafiaral Province and Copiapo, Region III (Atacama). The type locality is situated near the sea. It is known to habitate thin sand, particularly in narrow Y-shaped burrows. During the day, the sand covers the flap-door completely. At night, the burrows are opened (its flap-door turned completely backwards). Spiders stay at the door awaiting prey.

See also
Spider anatomy
List of Nemesiidae species
Regions of Chile

References

Further reading
Arthropods in arid South America:

External links

ADW entry

Nemesiidae
Spiders of South America
Monotypic Mygalomorphae genera
Endemic fauna of Chile